Lakeville High School is a historic high school building located at Lakeville, St. Joseph County, Indiana.  It was built in 1931, and is a two-story, "T"-plan, Collegiate Gothic style brick building.  It sits on a concrete foundation and has a flat roof with brick and stone parapet wall.  The front facade consists of a central tower flanked by two long wings ending in towers of similar proportion.  The school closed in 1983, and now houses a community center.

It was listed on the National Register of Historic Places in 1991.

References

School buildings on the National Register of Historic Places in Indiana
Collegiate Gothic architecture in Indiana
School buildings completed in 1931
Schools in St. Joseph County, Indiana
National Register of Historic Places in St. Joseph County, Indiana